The University of Europe for Applied Sciences, shortened as UE, is a private, for-profit university in Germany with its main campus and administrative headquarters in Iserlohn and further campuses in Berlin, Potsdam, Hanover and Hamburg.

It was formed in 2017 as the University of Applied Sciences Europe by a merger of the Business and Information Technology School and the Berliner Technische Kunsthochschule. The university was previously owned by the American company Laureate Education and was acquired by Global University Systems in 2018. In October 2020, the university changed its name to University of Europe for Applied Sciences.

Merged and affiliated institutions

Business and Information Technology School
Before its merger into what is now the University of Europe for Applied Sciences, the Business and Information Technology School (known informally as BiTS) was a state-approved, private higher education college (Hochschule). It was founded in 2000 by the German entrepreneur and author .  The college's first and main campus was in a former British military hospital in Iserlohn. Initially, it taught business administration with a special emphasis on entrepreneurship, but over the years more and more subjects were added and the number of students grew steadily. In 2008, BiTS was bought by Laureate Education and established branches in Berlin in 2012 and Hamburg in 2013. In 2013 it had a total enrollment of approximately 1800 students, but by 2016 its numbers had begun to fall. It was at this point that Laureate Education initiated its merger with another Laureate-owned college, Berliner Technische Kunsthochschule, into the University of Applied Sciences Europe. Laureate then began looking for a buyer for the newly formed institution. Alumni of the Business and Information Technology School include the German politician Paul Ziemiak.

Berliner Technische Kunsthochschule
Also known as BTK, the Berliner Technische Kunsthochschule was a private, state-approved university for training designers located on Bernburger Straße in Berlin. It specialised in the interface of design, art, and new media. BTK was founded in 2006 by four individuals and received its initial accreditation in 2009. It was bought by Laureate Education in 2011. Following the acquisition, two further branches were established in Iserlohn in 2012 and Hamburg in 2013. In the 2013–14 academic year it had an enrollment of 502 students, 479 on its five bachelor's programmes and 23 on its master's programme. By the time of its merger into the University of Applied Sciences in 2017, BTK had added a bachelor's degree in video game design and a master's degree in photography. Several of its programmes had both German and English-language versions.

HTK Academy of Design
The HTK Academy of Design is a private state-approved vocational school which specialises in training graphic designers for the advertising and publishing sectors. It was founded in Hamburg in 1987 as the Hamburger Technische Kunstschule. It is closely affiliated to the University of Europe for Applied Sciences, a relationship that has continued from its affiliation with the Berliner Technische Kunsthochschule (BTK) which began in 2016. Its main site is now on Museumstraße in Hamburg which it shares with the University of Europe for Applied Sciences, with a further branch in Berlin which had opened in 2001 and is now located on the university's Berlin campus. Like BTK, HTK was bought by Laureate Education in 2011. It was subsequently acquired by Global University Systems in 2018 at the same time the company purchased the University of Applied Sciences Europe.

Programmes
The university has three faculties:
Business and Psychology, originally taught at the Business and Information Technology School
Sport, Media, and Event Management, originally taught at the Business and Information Technology School
Art and Design, originally taught at the Berliner Technische Kunsthochschule
Together, they offer a number of undergraduate and post-graduate degrees, some of which are taught in English.

Campuses
Iserlohn, located at Reiterweg 26B near the shores of Lake Seilersee, the original campus of the Business and Information Technology School (BiTS), and the administrative headquarters of UE
Berlin, located at Dessauer Straße 3–5 in the Kreuzberg district near the original campus of the Berliner Technische Kunsthochschule (BTK)
Hamburg, opened in 2014 and located at Museumstraße 39 in the Altona district near the Altona train station and the River Elbe
Innovation HUB Potsdam, The campus offers technology focused programmes in a modern and state-of-the-art building. Located at Konrad-Zuse-Ring 11 Potsdam.

See also
Fachhochschule (the German term for universities of applied sciences in general)

References

External links
 (in German and English)

Private universities and colleges in Germany
2017 establishments in Germany
Business schools in Germany
For-profit universities and colleges in Europe
Universities and colleges formed by merger in Germany
Universities and colleges in North Rhine-Westphalia